Samuel Katz may refer to:

 Sam Katz (Philadelphia) (born 1949), American politician
 Samuel Katz (pediatrician) (1927–2022), American pediatrician and virologist
 Sam Katz (born 1951), mayor of Winnipeg
 Sam Katz (rugby union) (born 1990), English rugby union player
 Shmuel Katz (politician) (1914–2008), Israeli militant, writer, historian and Knesset member

See also 
 Shmuel Katz (disambiguation)